The karyorelictid nuclear code (translation table 27) is a genetic code used by the nuclear genome of the Karyorelictea ciliate Parduczia sp.

The code (27)

   AAs  = FFLLSSSSYYQQCCWWLLLAPPPPHHQQRRRRIIIMTTTTNNKKSSRRVVVVAAAADDEEGGGG
Starts = --------------*--------------------M----------------------------
 Base1 = TTTTTTTTTTTTTTTTCCCCCCCCCCCCCCCCAAAAAAAAAAAAAAAAGGGGGGGGGGGGGGGG
 Base2 = TTTTCCCCAAAAGGGGTTTTCCCCAAAAGGGGTTTTCCCCAAAAGGGGTTTTCCCCAAAAGGGG
 Base3 = TCAGTCAGTCAGTCAGTCAGTCAGTCAGTCAGTCAGTCAGTCAGTCAGTCAGTCAGTCAGTCAG

Bases: adenine (A), cytosine (C), guanine (G) and thymine (T) or uracil (U).

Amino acids: Alanine (Ala, A), Arginine (Arg, R), Asparagine (Asn, N), Aspartic acid (Asp, D), Cysteine (Cys, C), Glutamic acid (Glu, E), Glutamine (Gln, Q), Glycine (Gly, G), Histidine (His, H), Isoleucine (Ile, I), Leucine (Leu, L), Lysine (Lys, K), Methionine (Met, M), Phenylalanine (Phe, F), Proline (Pro, P), Serine (Ser, S), Threonine (Thr, T), Tryptophan (Trp, W), Tyrosine (Tyr, Y), and Valine (Val, V).

Differences from the standard code

See also 
 List of all genetic codes: translation tables 1 to 16, and 21 to 31.
 The genetic codes database.

References

Molecular genetics
Gene expression
Protein biosynthesis